Vladimir Augusto Gessen Rodríguez is a Venezuelan politician, journalist and psychologist.

Career 
He graduated as a licentiate in psychology from Central University of Venezuela, Caracas with a degree in industrial psychology, completed postgraduate in clinical psychopathology from the University of Barcelona, Spain and received a Doctor Honoris Causa from the Bicentenary University of Aragua. He has done Master's studies in social sciences at the Florida International University and FLACSO.

References

Year of birth missing (living people)
Living people
Venezuelan politicians
Venezuelan journalists
Venezuelan psychologists
Central University of Venezuela alumni
Tourism ministers of Venezuela
Members of the Venezuelan Chamber of Deputies